Ovod is a Russian word meaning Gadfly. It may refer to several films based on Ethel Lilian Voynich's 1897 novel The Gadfly:
Krazana, 1928 Georgian SSR (USSR) film "Ovod"
Ovod (1928 film)
Ovod (1955 film)
Ovod (1980 film)
Ovod (opera)
Ovod (suite)
Ovod corvette
Ovod (plane)